"Calling America" is a song by the rock music group Electric Light Orchestra (ELO) released as a single from their 1986 album Balance of Power. The single reached number 28 in the United Kingdom, making it their 26th and final Top 40 hit single in their native country and peaked at number 18 on the Billboard singles chart, making it their 20th and final Top 40 hit single in the United States.

Overview
Like most of the songs on Balance of Power, "Calling America" is musically upbeat and bright. Lyrically, it features a similar theme to ELO's earlier single "Telephone Line", where the narrator is longing for a lover from across the telephone, although "Calling America" also discusses satellite communication. Appropriately, the song pays homage to the track "Telstar", which had celebrated the communication satellite of the same name, in the instrumental section. In his column Real Life Rock (published in The Village Voice), Greil Marcus called the song an "answer record to [the] 24-year old hit". Fellow American music journalist Chuck Eddy said, "Greil Marcus was the only person besides me who realized that 'Calling America' by ELO was one of the most brilliant records of last year. I thought it was really neat that it ended up on both our top 10s."
 
Epic Records released a three-track 12-inch single in the UK, with "Destination Unknown" as the B-side.

Reception
Cash Box called it a "bright, cleanly done bit of pop sheen from the masters of the genre" with a "very hooky lyric."  Billboard said that it has ELO's "familiar wall of sound and sci-fi predilections."

Track listing
All songs written by Jeff Lynne.

7-inch single
"Calling America" – 3:28
"Caught in a Trap" – 3:43

US 12-inch single
"Calling America" – 3:28
"Caught in a Trap" – 3:43
"Endless Lies" – 2:54

UK 12-inch single
"Calling America" – 3:28
"Caught in a Trap" – 3:43
"Destination Unknown" – 4:10
"Rock'n' Roll Is King" - 3:49
"Secret Messages" - 4:44

Chart history

Video
The video, directed by John Beug and Jane Simpson, was shot in Paris and contains shots of Centre Georges Pompidou; the band plays in front of Pompidou.

References

External links
Single chart positions
ftmusic.com - UK single b-side "Destination Unknown"
 (licensed content by Sony BMG)

1986 songs
1986 singles
Electric Light Orchestra songs
Song recordings produced by Jeff Lynne
Songs written by Jeff Lynne
Songs about telephones
Epic Records singles
Songs about the United States
CBS Records singles